Mrigala is a village in Chanditala II CD Block in Srirampore subdivision of Hooghly district in the Indian state of West Bengal. It was earlier recorded as a census town.

Geography

Demographics
 India census, Mrigala had a population of 17,664. Males constitute 51% of the population and females 49%. Mrigala has an average literacy rate of 73%, higher than the national average of 59.5%: male literacy is 78%, and female literacy is 67%. In Mrigala, 11% of the population is under 6 years of age.

References

Villages in Chanditala II CD Block